Phyllonorycter foliolosi is a moth of the family Gracillariidae. It is endemic to the Canary Islands and is known from La Palma and Tenerife.

Ecology
The larvae feed on Adenocarpus viscosus, Adenocarpus complicatus aureus, Adenocarpus foliolosus, and Teline canariensis. They mine the leaves of their host plant. They create a strongly contracted, lower-surface tentiform mine. The leaflet is folded lengthwise and completely eaten out. The leaf turns whitish-transparent. Pupation takes place within the mine.

References

foliolosi
Moths of Africa
Endemic insects of the Canary Islands
Taxa named by Thomas de Grey, 6th Baron Walsingham
Moths described in 1908